Winchester Thurston School is an independent, coeducational preparatory school located in the Shadyside neighborhood of Pittsburgh, Pennsylvania. Established in 1887, Winchester Thurston offers PK–12 education in Lower, Middle, and Upper School. The school is a member of the Pittsburgh Consortium of Independent Schools.

History
Winchester Thurston has its origins in the founding of the all-girls Thurston Preparatory School by Alice M. Thurston in Shadyside in 1887. The Winchester School was founded separately, also in Shadyside, as a coeducational school 1902. The two schools merged to produce the all-girls Winchester Thurston School in 1935. The school moved to its current Shadyside campus, formerly the site of Shady Side Academy, in the fall of 1967. The school added its second Lower School campus in Allison Park in 1988; this campus permanently closed in June 2020. Winchester Thurston became co-educational in 1991.

The school has constructed several facilities, including the Main Building in 1963, a science wing in 1987, and a new turf field called Garland Field. The school has three libraries, an art gallery, Mellon Gymnasium, an athletics hall of fame, a solarium, a learning garden, a dance studio, the Hillman Dining Hall, Lower, Middle, and Upper school science labs, and three computer labs.

Curriculum

Arts
Winchester Thurston has received Gene Kelly Awards and nominations for their theater performances.

Extracurricular activities

Athletics
The interscholastic sports program provides Middle and Upper School students opportunities to represent WT on the Pittsburgh area's courts, tracks, and fields. WT fields athletes in crew, cross country, field hockey, golf, soccer, tennis, basketball, fencing, squash, lacrosse, and track. In 2021, the Boys' Soccer team won the WPIAL and PIAA State Championships and recorded a 24-0 undefeated season.

References

External links
 Official Winchester Thurston School website

Private elementary schools in Pennsylvania
Middle schools in Pittsburgh
High schools in Pittsburgh
Educational institutions established in 1887
Educational institutions established in 1902
Educational institutions established in 1935
Private high schools in Pennsylvania
Private middle schools in Pennsylvania
Preparatory schools in Pennsylvania
1935 establishments in Pennsylvania